Bowmer + Kirkland Group is a British construction services business based in Heage, Derbyshire.

History
The company was established in 1923 as a partnership between joiner Alfred Bowmer and bricklayer Robert William Kirkland.

In July 2009 the firm was involved in a crane collapse in Liverpool that left a man paralysed and 100 people removed from their homes. The company was subsequently found guilty of breaching health and safety laws.

Chairman John Kirkland died in November 2021.

Major projects
Major projects have included:
St George's Park National Football Centre in Staffordshire, completed in 2012
Trinity Square in Gateshead, completed in 2013
Center Parcs Woburn Forest in Bedfordshire, completed in 2014
Derby Arena, completed in 2015
St Marks Student Village for the University of Lincoln, due to be completed in 2021

References

External links 
 Bowmer & Kirkland

Construction and civil engineering companies of England
Companies based in Derbyshire
Construction and civil engineering companies established in 1923
1923 establishments in England
British companies established in 1923